The Institute for Research in Biomedicine (IRB Barcelona) is an institution engaged in fundamental research at the interface between molecular and cell biology, computational and structural biology and chemistry, with experts in proteomics, genomics, biostatistics and advanced digital microscopy. The institute was created by the Government of Catalonia in October 2005 and is located at the Barcelona Science Park (Parc Científic de Barcelona - PCB). The director of the Institute is Prof. Francesc Posas and the Prof. Joan Massagué Solé is scientific advisor. IRB Barcelona was recently named a "Severo Ochoa Centre of Excellence" by the Spanish Ministry of Science and Innovation (2011), current Ministry of Economy and Competitiveness.

References

External links
 

Medical research institutes in Spain
Research institutes in Catalonia